Denis-Danso Weidlich (born 8 July 1986) is a Ghanaian-German professional footballer who plays as a centre back.

Career
In June 2016, Weidlich was released by Holstein Kiel after one season with the club. He was a starter, making 32 appearances.

In summer 2016, Weidlich moved to South Africa, joining Maritzburg United. Since 2018 he is playing for Bidvest Wits.

References

External links
 
 

1986 births
Living people
German sportspeople of Ghanaian descent
German footballers
Footballers from Hamburg
Association football central defenders
Association football midfielders
2. Bundesliga players
3. Liga players
Regionalliga players
South African Premier Division players
SV Wilhelmshaven players
SV Babelsberg 03 players
FC Rot-Weiß Erfurt players
SSV Jahn Regensburg players
FC Hansa Rostock players
Maritzburg United F.C. players
Bidvest Wits F.C. players
BSV Schwarz-Weiß Rehden players
CFC Hertha 06 players
German expatriate footballers
German expatriate sportspeople in England
Expatriate footballers in England
German expatriate sportspeople in South Africa
Expatriate soccer players in South Africa